Muskingum Township is one of the twenty-five townships of Muskingum County, Ohio, United States.  The 2010 census found 4,520 people in the township.

Geography
Located in the north central part of the county, it borders the following townships:
Cass Township - north
Madison Township - northeast
Washington Township - southwest
Falls Township - south
Licking Township - west

No municipalities are located in Muskingum Township.

Name and history
The name Muskingum may come from the Shawnee word mshkikwam 'swampy ground'. The name may also be from Lenape "Machkigen," referring to thorns, or a specific species of thorn bush. Muskingum has also been taken to mean 'elk's eye' (mus wəshkinkw) by folk etymology, as in mus 'elk'  + wəshkinkw 'its eye'. Moravian missionary David Zeisberger wrote that the Muskingum River was called Elk's Eye "because of the numbers of elk that formerly fed on its banks."

A Lenape village named Muskingum was established in the area in 1747 and was an important trade center in the early 1750s, until it was devastated by smallpox in the winter of 1752. 

Statewide, the only other Muskingum Township is located in Washington County.

Emergency services
The Muskingum Township is protected by the Falls Township Fire Department, which provides Fire & EMS services to Falls Township, Muskingum Township and mutual aid for surrounding departments. Falls Township Fire Department currently has 3 stations.

Government
The township is governed by a three-member board of trustees, who are elected in November of odd-numbered years to a four-year term beginning on the following January 1. Two are elected in the year after the presidential election and one is elected in the year before it. There is also an elected township fiscal officer, who serves a four-year term beginning on April 1 of the year after the election, which is held in November of the year before the presidential election. Vacancies in the fiscal officership or on the board of trustees are filled by the remaining trustees.

Demographics

Education
Nashport Elementary, which is part of the Tri-Valley Local School District, is located on Creamery Road in Muskingum Township.

References

External links
County website

Townships in Muskingum County, Ohio
Townships in Ohio